Tammejärve is a village in Saku Parish, Harju County in northern Estonia. It is located between Lake Raku and Tallinn–Viljandi road.

References

 

Villages in Harju County